This is a list of all United States Supreme Court cases from volume 538 of the United States Reports:

External links

2003 in United States case law